Buffalo is a city in and the county seat of Dallas County, Missouri, United States. The population was 3,290 at the 2020 census.

Buffalo is part of the Springfield, Missouri Metropolitan Statistical Area.

History
Buffalo was platted in 1841, and named after Buffalo, New York, the native home of a first settler. A post office called Buffalo has been in operation since 1846.

On October 7, 2013, Mayor Andrew Mead proclaimed October 23 to be "Weird Al" Yankovic day to honor his childhood hero. Weird Al was presented the key to the city in April of that year. Mead resigned later in the same meeting.

June 23 is Peggy Kay day to honor the gracious woman who has contributed so much of her talent, time, and energy since 1971 to the town of Buffalo, MO

Geography
The city is located in west central Dallas County, approximately 2.5 miles west of the Niangua River. The city is served by U.S. Route 65 and Missouri state routes 73 and 32. Bolivar is about 18 miles to the west and Marshfield is about 22 miles to the southeast. Springfield lies 28 miles to the south-southwest along Route 65.

Demographics

Buffalo is the home to the Dallas County R-I School District. The school district includes a service area that includes students from western Laclede, southern Dallas, and eastern Polk counties. The school district includes an elementary school in Buffalo (Dillard A. Mallory Elementary). Buffalo Prairie Middle School, Buffalo High School, and the Dallas County Technical Center are all part of the school district. The mascot for Dallas County R-I Schools is the Bison (commonly named Buffy). The school district is part of the Central Ozarks Conference (COC) and currently has an enrollment of approximately 1,800 students grades K-12.

2010 census
As of the census of 2010, there were 3,084 people, 1,266 households, and 760 families living in the city. The racial makeup of the city was 95.8% White, 0.3% African American, 0.9% Native American, 0.2% Asian, 0.2% Pacific Islander, 1.1% from other races, and 1.6% from two or more races. Hispanic or Latino of any race were 3.2% of the population.

There were 1,266 households, of which 32.7% had children under the age of 18 living with them, 37.4% were married couples living together, 16.9% had a female householder with no husband present, 5.8% had a male householder with no wife present, and 40.0% were non-families. 34.4% of all households were made up of individuals, and 16.8% had someone living alone who was 65 years of age or older. The average household size was 2.30 and the average family size was 2.92.

The median age in the city was 37.9 years. 25.1% of residents were under the age of 18; 8.4% were between the ages of 18 and 24; 23.4% were from 25 to 44; 22.2% were from 45 to 64; and 20.9% were 65 years of age or older. The gender makeup of the city was 45.1% male and 54.9% female.

2000 census
As of the census of 2000, there were 2,781 people, 1,213 households, and 702 families living in the city. The population density was 1,265.1 people per square mile (488.1/km2). There were 1,367 housing units at an average density of 621.9 per square mile (239.9/km2). The racial makeup of the city was 96.91% White, 0.29% African American, 0.72% Native American, 0.04% Asian, 0.36% from other races, and 1.69% from two or more races. Hispanic or Latino of any race were 1.26% of the population.

There were 1,213 households, out of which 28.7% had children under the age of 18 living with them, 40.8% were married couples living together, 14.4% had a female householder with no husband present, and 42.1% were non-families. 37.3% of all households were made up of individuals, and 21.3% had someone living alone who was 65 years of age or older. The average household size was 2.20 and the average family size was 2.89.

In the city, the population was spread out, with 24.9% under the age of 18, 9.5% from 18 to 24, 26.0% from 25 to 44, 18.2% from 45 to 64, and 21.4% who were 65 years of age or older. The median age was 37 years. For every 100 females, there were 84.8 males. For every 100 females age 18 and over, there were 76.6 males.

The median income for a household in the city was $19,632, and the median income for a family was $26,179. Males had a median income of $24,306 versus $16,397 for females. The per capita income for the city was $11,942. About 25.9% of families and 28.9% of the population were below the poverty line, including 50.4% of those under age 18 and 18.6% of those age 65 or over.

Economy
Much of the economy of Buffalo is related to agriculture, government, education, and healthcare.

Top employers
Major employers include Dallas County R-1 Schools, Dallas County government, the City of Buffalo, Wood's Supermarket, O'Bannon Bank, and Bank of Urbana.

Government
Buffalo is a Fourth class city. Buffalo city government has a mayor and six aldermen. Buffalo provides municipal water and sewer and contracts for refuse service.

Education
The Dallas County R-1 School District serves Buffalo and surrounding areas. Approximately 1700 students attend 4 schools, including Mallory Elementary, Buffalo Prairie Middle School, Dallas County Technical Center, and Buffalo High School.

The town has a lending library, the Dallas County Library.

Recreation
Buffalo has two large city parks. The city also features an extensive network of trails and sidewalks connecting Buffalo Prairie Middle School to the south across town to the new city park to the north.

Buffalo features numerous opportunities within the city for recreation including Buffalo Bowl, several restaurants, live music at the Maple & Main, and various street festivals throughout the year.

Nearby Missouri Department of Conservation areas include the Barclay Conservation Area, Bennett Spring Access, Bennett Spring Fish Hatchery, Goose Creek Conservation Area, and Lead Mine Conservation Area.

Recreational resources in the area include Pomme de Terre Lake and various theaters, shopping and other entertainment in Bolivar, Springfield and the Lake of the Ozarks area.

Sports
In 2015, the Lady Bison high school basketball team competed in the Final 4 at state competition.
In 2020 they won a football district championship.

Arts and culture
Buffalo has for years hosted the Southwest Missouri Celtic Heritage Festival & Highland Games.

Buffalo annually hosts the Buffalo Art Walk and Craft Fair.

Transportation

Highways
Buffalo is served by U.S. Route 65 which connects the city with Branson, Springfield, Warsaw, and Sedalia.
Missouri Route 32 carries traffic from El Dorado Springs, Stockton, Fair Play, Bolivar, Lebanon, Lynchburg and other communities. Missouri Route 73 connects Buffalo to U.S. Route 54 in Camden County.

Airport
The Buffalo Municipal Airport is a city-owned public-use airport located 1.2 miles (1.9 km) north of Buffalo's central business district.

Notable people
 Hugh Alexander, baseball player
 Philip Allen Bennett, Missouri Senator and Lt. Governor, US Congressman
 Louis Brownlow, author
 Miranda Maverick, fighter in the flyweight division of the UFC
 James B. Potter, Jr., Los Angeles City Council member, 1963–71
 Terry D. Scott, 10th Master Chief Petty Officer of the U.S. Navy
 Dallas Willard, Christian philosopher and author.

References

External links
 City of Buffalo
 Buffalo Reflex newspaper
 Dallas County R-I School District
 Buffalo Area Chamber of Commerce
 Historic maps of Buffalo in the Sanborn Maps of Missouri Collection at the University of Missouri

Cities in Dallas County, Missouri
County seats in Missouri
Springfield metropolitan area, Missouri
Cities in Missouri